KNM may refer to:

 Kongelig Norsk Marine, Royal Norwegian Navy ship prefix
 Koninklijke Nederlandse Munt, Royal Dutch Mint, mint of the Netherlands 
 Kerala Nadvathul Mujahideen, a Salafi movement in India
 Kualanamu International Airport railway station, Indonesia, station code
 Kunsill Nazzjonali tal-Ilsien Malti, language regulator of Maltese